The Second Mother (German: Die zweite Mutter) is a 1925 German silent comedy film directed by Heinrich Bolten-Baeckers and starring Margarete Lanner, Hans Mierendorff and Maria Melchoir. It was one of a number of popular comedies released by UFA alongside its more prestigious art films.

Cast
 Margarete Lanner as Dorette Petresco 
 Hans Mierendorff as Ernst v. Schönwald 
 Maria Melchoir as Herta 
 Jack Trevor as Baron Fred Brochstädt 
 Liselotte Krämer as Lori 
 Mary Hannes   
 Oskar Fuchs as van der Verde 
 Leo Peukert as T. Weiringer 
 Emil Sondermannas Johann 
 Carl Zickner  
 Hans Stock

References

Bibliography
 Kreimeier, Klaus. The Ufa Story: A History of Germany's Greatest Film Company, 1918-1945. University of California Press, 1999.

External links

1925 films
1925 comedy films
Films of the Weimar Republic
German silent feature films
German comedy films
Films directed by Heinrich Bolten-Baeckers
UFA GmbH films
German black-and-white films
Silent comedy films
1920s German films